Cibola County Correctional Center is a privately owned minimum-security prison, located at 2000 Cibola Loop in Milan, Cibola County, New Mexico.  

The facility first opened in 1993 as a county prison with capacity to house state prisoners, and was then acquired and expanded by the Corrections Corporation of America in 1998.  It has a capacity of 1129 inmates.  Until October 2016 it housed federal minimum-security prisoners under a contract with the United States Federal Bureau of Prisons and the United States Marshal Service. but was soon re-opened under a new contract with U.S. Immigration and Customs Enforcement.  

This facility is unrelated to Western New Mexico Correctional Facility, also in Cibola County, operated by the New Mexico Corrections Department with an inmate capacity of 440.

Closure  

Before the facility was closed in 2016, it had been a "standout example of the problems at the BOP's private prisons". 

Almost 700 Cibola County inmates staged a non-violent protest of prison conditions on April 23, 2001 and were tear-gassed.  In March 2013 about 250 inmates staged another non-violent protest, which was resolved peacefully.  Prison officials declined to reveal the reason for the protest.  As of June 2002, 95% of prisoners held in Cibola County were undocumented Mexican nationals.

From 2007-2016, 30 of the 34 citations against the facility were related to poor medical care, including the lack of an on-location doctor, failure to perform CPR, and lack of mental health evaluation for a suicidal inmate. 
  
In August 2016, Justice Department officials announced that the FBOP would be phasing out its use of contracted facilities, on the grounds that private prisons provided less safe and less effective services with no substantial cost savings.  The agency expected to allow current contracts on its thirteen remaining private facilities to expire.  The same month CCA announced that their federal contract had not been renewed. The FBOP removed its last prisoner on October 1, and facility was slated to close with the loss of about 300 local jobs.

ICE administration  

The facility was reopened with an Immigration and Customs Enforcement contract under CCA's new name, CoreCivic. 

There are open lawsuits and investigations related to deaths of people who were detained in the facility since October 2016. A 2018 hearing at the New Mexico state capitol documented experiences of abuse and negligence at both Cibola and Otero County Prison Facility.

Transgender migrant detention 

Cibola County includes facilities for ongoing detention of transgender migrant detainees, one of the only following the closure of a dedicated ICE detention pod for gay, bisexual, and transgender (GBT) detainees in Santa Ana.  In November 2018, an independent autopsy indicated that Roxsana Hernandez Rodriguez, a 33 year old transgender woman seeking asylum from Honduras who was detained at Cibola County, had been physically abused in before being detained in Cibola County. Rodriguez was one of at least four immigrants who died in CoreCivic facilities in 2018. Transgender women detained at the facility have a higher rate of receiving legal representation than other detainees, however face significant mental health challenges.

References

External links 

Cibola County Correctional Center (CoreCivic)
Cibola Detention Center (New Mexico Immigrant Law Center)

Prisons in New Mexico
CoreCivic
Buildings and structures in Cibola County, New Mexico
1993 establishments in New Mexico